Bonnie James Campbell or Bonnie George Campbell is Child ballad 210 (Roud 338). The ballad tells of man who has gone off to fight, but only his horse returns.  The name differs across variants. Several names have been suggested as the inspiration of the ballad: Archibald or James Campbell, in the Battle of Glenlivet, or Sir John Campbell of Calder, who was murdered.

Synopsis 
Bonnie James (or George) Campbell rides out one day.  His horse returns, but he does not.  His bride comes out, grieving, that the fields are still growing the harvest but he will never return. In some variants, his mother or sisters also come out when his horse returns. In one of the variants, Campbell laments that "my babe is unborn."

Lyrics
 High upon Highlands,
 and laigh upon Tay.
 Bonnie George Campbell
 rode out on a day.

 He saddled, he bridled,
  and gallant rode he.
 And hame cam his guid horse,
  but never cam he.

 Out cam his mother dear,
  greeting fu sair.
 Out cam his bonnie bryde,
  riving her hair.

 "The meadow lies green,
  and the corn is unshorn.
 But Bonnie George Campbell
  will never return."

 Saddled and bridled
  and booted rode he,
 A plume in his helmet,
  a sword at his knee.

 But toom cam his saddle
  all bloody to see.
 Oh, hame cam his guid horse,
  but never cam he.

See also 
 Scottish mythology
 English folklore

References

External links
Bonnie James Campbell
Bonnie George Campbell with history
Bonnie George Campbell Lyrics
Reference to Opera singer Portia White sings the ballad before Queen Elizabeth
Version of Bonnie George Campbell recorded by Barnsley folk trio String Theory

Child Ballads
Border ballads
Northumbrian folklore
Anglo-Scottish border